Musa ibn Ja'far al-Kazim, also known as Abū al-Ḥasan, Abū ʿAbd Allāh or Abū Ibrāhīm, was the seventh Imam in Twelver Shia Islam, after his father Ja'far al-Sadiq. He was born in 745 CE in Medina, and his imamate coincided with the reigns of the Abbasid caliphs al-Mansur, al-Hadi, al-Mahdi and Harun al-Rashid. Musa was a seventh generation descendant of Muhammad through his daughter Fatima. He was repeatedly imprisoned and harassed by the caliphs and finally died in 799 at the al-Sindi ibn Shahiq prison of Baghdad, possibly poisoned at the order of Harun. Ali al-Rida, the eighth Twelver Imam, and Fatemah al-Ma'suma were among his children. Al-Kazim was renowned for his piety and is revered by the Sunni as a traditionist and by the Sufi as an ascetic.

Life

Birth and early life
Musa was born in 128 AH (745 CE) in Medina or at al-Abwa', between Medina and Mecca. Other dates given are 127 and 129 AH. His father was al-Sadiq, the sixth Shia Imam, who was a descendant of Ali and Fatima, cousin and daughter of the Islamic prophet, respectively. His mother was Hamida Khatun, a Berber slave-girl from Andalusia. She was known as Hamida the Pure and was respected for her religious learning, teaching jurisprudence to women in a seminary in Medina. Musa reportedly grew up in a large family, with six brothers and nine sisters. According to Donaldson, he was four years old when Saffah, the first Abbasid caliph, took the throne. For about twenty years, Musa under the authority of his father, al-Sadiq, who died in 765 CE, poisoned by Caliph al-Mansur in Shia sources.

After his father 
In Medina, al-Kazim adopted a quiescent attitude and kept aloof from politics, similar to his predecessors, Zayn al-Abidin, al-Baqir, and al-Sadiq. He reportedly did not support al-Husayn ibn Ali al-Abid, a Hasanid descendent of Ali who revolted against the Abbasids in the Hejaz in 786 and was killed near Mecca, together with many other Alids. As with his father, al-Kazim taught and spread Shia beliefs to his disciples.

Al-Kazim was contemporary with the Abbasid caliphs al-Mansur, al-Hadi, al-Mahdi, and Harun al-Rashid. The Abbasid anti-Shia prosecution weighed heavily on the Shia Imams, especially after the revolt of al-Nafs al-Zakiyya. In particular, the Abbasid caliphs were hostile to al-Kazim and, unlike his father, who taught freely in Medina, al-Kazim lived wundertight restrictions set by the caliphs.

Reign of al-Mansur 
The caliphate of al-Mansur overlapped with the first ten years of the imamate of al-Kazim. Al-Mansur is responsible, according to Shia sources for poisoning al-Kazim's father, al-Sadiq. According to Tabatabai, upon hearing the news of al-Sadiq's death, al-Mansur ordered the governor of Medina to behead his heir, the future Imam. The governor, however, learned that al-Sadiq had chosen four people, rather than one, to administer his will: al-Mansur himself, the governor, the Imam's oldest (surviving) son Abdullah al-Aftah, and al-Kazim al-Kadhim, his younger son. Al-Mansur's plot was thus foiled. Kohlberg includes a similar account but with five legatees instead of four. Momen writes that the harassment of al-Kazim by al-Mansur was not as intense as his successors, though Donaldson suggests that al-Kazim must have often felt apprehensive about his fate, knowing that he was under surveillance by the caliph.

Reign of al-Mahdi 
During the ten years of the reign of al-Mahdi, spies were planted in Medina to keep al-Kazim under surveillance, according to Momen. Al-Kazim was arrested at least once by al-Mahdi, who briefly imprisoned him in Baghdad around 780. He was placed in charge of the prefect of police, al-Musayyab ibn Zuhayr al-Dabbi, who later became a follower of al-Kazim. It is said that al-Mahdi had a dream in which Ali, the first Shia Imam, berated him for imprisoning his progeny. Al-Kazim was subsequently released and given a gift of 3000 dinars after he assured the caliph of his apolitical stance.

Reign of Harun al-Rashid 
The prosecution of the Shia reached a climax during the reign of Harun, who is said to have killed hundreds of Alids. Harun arrested al-Kazim and brought him to Baghdad and was apparently intent on executing him but then set him free as a result of a dream, it is said. This account is detailed by Donaldson, who also suggests that Harun might have been provoked by an earlier incident where the two men visited the tomb of Muhammad in Medina. There, to show his family ties to the prophet, Harun had reportedly said, "Salutation unto thee, O Prophet of God, unto thee who art my cousin!" al-Kazim had countered with, "Salutation unto thee, O my dear father!" This angered Harun, who retorted, "Abul-Hasan [Musa], such glory as thine is truly to be vaunted of!"

The final imprisonment of al-Kazim is said to have been plotted by Harun's vizier, Yahya ibn Khalid, who was threatened by the growing influence of Ja'far ibn Muhammad after Harun placed his son and heir, Amin, under Ja'far's custody. Ja'far was a secret Shia, and Yahya thus began feeding information to Harun about Ja'far's devotion to his Imam, al-Kazim. Another account is that Harun found the views of Hisham ibn al-Hakam, a disciple of al-Kazim, to be dangerous. In any case, Harun arrested al-Kazim in 793 or 795 and brought to Basra, where he was imprisoned for a year under the custody of the governor Isa ibn Ja'far ibn al-Mansur. Harun then ordered him to be killed, but Isa, who had been impressed by the piety of al-Kazim, evaded the order and instead brought him to Baghdad, where he was kept under house arrest by al-Fadl ibn al-Rabi' and then by al-Fadl ibn Yahya al-Barmaki. Al-Kazim seems to have continued to direct the affairs of the Shia during his house arrest. When Harun learned about the relatively comfortable conditions of al-Kazim, he gave al-Fadl a written order to kill al-Kazim. By one account, al-Fadl also refused and was given a hundred lashes. Al-Kazim was then handed to al-Sindi ibn Shahik, the prefect of police in Baghdad, who is said to have poisoned the Imam.

Death 

Al-Kazim died in 799 in the al-Sindi ibn Shahiq prison of Baghdad, after being transferred from one prison to another for a few years. He is said to have been poisoned at the instigation of Harun, who gave al-Sindi the orders through Yahya ibn Khalid when he visited the caliph in Rakka. The Sunni historian al-Tabari, however, does not mention the cause of his death, thus implying that al-Kazim died from natural causes, a view preferred by most Sunni authors.

Harun brought several public figures to examine the body of Musa for wounds and testify that he had died a natural death. There are accounts that Harun also made a public display of Musa's body in Baghdad to put to rest the rumor that al-Kazim had not died and would return as Mahdi, the promised savior in Islam. Al-Kazim was buried in the prestigious cemetery of the Quraysh in northwest Baghdad, which is now located in the city of Kazimayn. Visiting the site was initially not devoid of risk at first, but eventually his tomb, together with that of his grandson, al-Jawad, became an important center for pilgrimage. A shrine has stood over their graves since the time of the Buyid dynasty and the present magnificent shrine was constructed by the Safavid Shah Isma'il. Kazimayn is also the burial site of many medieval Shia scholars, such as the polymath Nasir al-Din al-Tusi.

By some Shia accounts, al-Kazim died for the sins of his followers. Al-Kazim is reported to have said that God had given him the option to sacrifice himself to protect his Shia from His wrath. These sins were disloyalty and abandoning  (religious dissimulation), according to al-Kulayni, who adds that the latter sin revealed the activities of Imam and led to his imprisonment. Hussain writes that al-Rashid carried out a campaign of arrests to decimate the (underground) network of local Shia representatives which ultimately led to the arrest of al-Kazim and his death in prison.

Imamate 
After the death of al-Sadiq, his following fractured. The majority, who came to be known as the Twelvers, are said to have followed his younger son, Musa al-Kazim. It also appears that some expected the next Imam to be al-Sadiq's eldest son, Isma'il, who predeceased his father. This group, which later formed the Isma'ili branch of Shia, either believed that Isma'il was still alive but in concealment or instead accepted the imamate of Isma'il's son, Muhammad. While the Twelvers and the Isma'ilis are the only extant Shia sects today, there were more factions at the time. In particular, some followers of al-Sadiq accepted the imamate of his eldest surviving son, Abdullah al-Aftah. This group, which became known as the Fathiyya, attributed to al-Sadiq a hadith to the effect that the imamate must be transmitted through the eldest son of the Imam. In contrast, the Twelver belief is that, as a boy, Musa had already been designated as the future Imam by al-Sadiq, who had also explained that the imamate was bestowed upon the most meritorious son of the Imam, "as Daniel selected Solomon from among his progeny." Al-Sadiq had thus nominated Musa, his third son, after the death of his eldest son, Isma'il, passing over his second son, Abdullah. As Abdullah died childless shortly after al-Sadiq, the majority of his followers returned to Musa. Musa also received the allegiance of the most renowned Shia students of his father, al-Sadiq, immediately after his death. These included Hisham ibn al-Hakam and Mu'min al-Taq (al-Ahwal).

His representatives
This underground network of agents across the Abbasid empire was founded by al-Kazim  though there is some evidence that an early network existed under al-Sadiq (d. 765). This network guided the financial and religious affairs of the Imamite Shias.
It appears that al-Kazim permitted cooperation with the Abbasids if it furthered the Shia cause. In particular, he allowed his companion, Ali ibn Yaqtin, to work for the Abbasids as long as he could promote justice and social welfare. Al-Kazim also practiced  (religious dissimulation) and Mavani writes that he instructed Ali ibn Yaqtin to practice the Sunni (and not the Shia) ablution because Ali had come under suspicion by the Sunni ruler.

As the (Twelver) Shia Imam, the activities of al-Kazim were tightly controlled by the Abbasid caliphs. Momen writes that many of the Shia who had split off at the beginning of the imamate of al-Kazim joined him later, and new Shia centers were established in Egypt and north-west Africa.

Succession 
Al-Kazim designated his son, Ali al-Rida (also known as Imam Ali Raza), as his successor. After his death, al-Rida was acknowledged as the next Imam by a significant group of al-Kazim's followers, who formed the main line of Shia and went on to become the Twelvers. None of the brothers of al-Rida claimed the imamate but some of them revolted against the Abbasids. Some of the followers of al-Kazim, however, claimed that he had not died and would return as Mahdi, the promised savior in Islam. These became known as the Waqifiyya though it appears that they later returned to the mainstream Shia, declaring al-Rida and his descendants as the lieutenants of al-Kazim. These also included the Bushariyya, named after Muhammad ibn Bashir, the gnostic from Kufa, who claimed to be the interim imam in the absence of al-Kazim. The term Waqifiyya is applied generally to any group who denies or hesitates over the death of a particular Shia Imam and refuses to recognize his successors.

According to Kohlberg, the creation of Waqifiyya might have had a financial reason. The representatives of al-Kazim in some locations evidently refused to hand over to al-Rida the monies entrusted to them, arguing that al-Kazim was the last Imam. These included Mansur ibn Yunus Buzurg and Ali ibn Abi Ḥamza al-Bataini, Ziyad ibn Marwan al-Kandi, Uthman ibn Isa al-Amiri al-Ruasi (Ruwasi). Some reports indicate that al-Ruasi repented.

Various  have been attributed to al-Kazim, such as that he spoke in his cradle, could speak in all languages, and spoke to birds and animals, and when he touched a truncated tree, it turned green and bore fruit. 
The first of the twenty-three karamat attributed to al-Kazim, according to Donaldson, took place against the claim of Imamate of his brother, Abdullah. Based on this report, al-Kazim, in the presence of the crowd he had called, asked them to prepare a pile of firewood and set it on fire. Then he stepped into the fire in the presence of some people in which Abdullah was also present, but he was not harmed. Then he asked his brother Abdullah to step into the fire if he really considered his Imamate claim to be authentic and approved by God. Based on this narration, Abdullah refused this challenge and left the assembly.
According to another report, al-Kazim encountered a woman who was crying with her children. When he inquired about the reason, he found out that the female cow from which they were making a living had just died. According to this report, Kazim performed two prostrations, "then he went and put his blessed finger on the cow, and she arose and stood up. The woman exclaimed, ‘Behold it is Jesus the son of Mary!’"

Ghulat
Some extremists such as Muhammad ibn Bashir, the founder of Bashiriyya, believed in the divinity of al-Kazim and claimed that he was not dead, but had merely gone into occultation and would return as the Mahdi. Bashir reportedly claimed that he himself was an imam (or prophet) waiting for Kazim's return. 
Hossein Modarressi traces the history of this ghali (extreme) belief back to the time of the Prophet of Islam and Ali bin Abi Talib, when some people believed that they had not died; rather they are absent and will return at the right time. Giving the image of God to imams started from the time of the first imam of the Shia, when a group considered him to be God and Ali ordered to burn them. Since the time of Ja'far al-Sadiq, another group of Ghulat was found who, imitating the extinct sect of Kaysanites, did not consider imams as God, but gave them superhuman aspects. They believed for example, that imams have unlimited knowledge and the power to control the universe and that God has delegated(Tafwiz) the work of the world to them. For this reason, they were called Mufawizah.
al-Kazim alongside his father, al-Sadiq, is said to have played a key role in rooting out extreme views (ghuluww) from Shia thought, especially the belief in the divinity of imams.

Family 
Donaldson writes that al-Kazim had a large family of eighteen sons and twenty-three daughters, whereas others have suggested between thirty-three to sixty children. In Iran, the lineage of al-Kazim account for seventy percent of the s (descendants of the prophet). According to Jannatul-Khulud, these children were all born to freed slaves.

Personality 
Donaldson writes that Musa was mild and patient in his temperament and was called al-Kazim and al-Abd al-Salih. Adamec adds that the latter title was a reference to his piety and his efforts to please God. According to Donaldson, the writings of the Sunni historian Ibn Khallikan seem to indicate the generosity and benevolence of al-Kazim: "that when a man had spoken ill of him, he sent him a purse containing one thousand dinars," and "that he used to tie up in packets sums of three hundred, or four hundred, or two hundred dinars and distribute them in the city of Medina." Rahim describes al-Kazim as quiet and retiring, and Kohlberg adds that he was renowned for his piety and spent most of his life in prayer and contemplation. As an illustration of al-Kazim's religious rather than political interest, Donaldson quotes "that he [al-Kazim] entered one evening into the mosque of God’s Apostle (at Medina) and, just as the night was setting in, he made a prostration which lasted until the morning, and during that time he was heard to request without intermission, 'O thou who art the object of our fear! O thou whom it becometh to show mercy! Let thy kindly pardon be granted to me whose sin is so grievous!'" Al-Kazim is said to have been a gifted polemicist who was able to win over his opponents. The celebrated Sunni legal scholar Abu Hanifa was silenced by al-Kazim and the Christians who came to dispute with him about religion accepted Islam.

Legacy 
Al-Kazim also taught Shia beliefs to his disciples. In particular, alongside his father, he is said to have played a key role in eradicating extremist views from the Shia thought, especially the belief in the divinity of Imams. His answers to legal questions are available in Wasiyya fi al-Akl in two versions, one abridged and one complete, and he is also credited with numerous supplications. His hadith, "The jurists who are believers (i.e., Shia) are the citadels of Islam," has been interpreted to encourage an active social role for religious scholars. The Safavid monarchs claimed descent from al-Kazim.   

Al-Kazim is revered in Sunni Islam and considered a respectable traditionalist by Sunni scholars. His traditions are collected in Musnad al-Kazim, which is extant. Al-Kazim was also a focus for Sufis, according to Kohlberg and Rahim. The ascetic Sufi Shaqiq ibn Ibrahim al-Balkhi regarded him as a holy person and a devout worshipper. Other Sufis, such as Ma'ruf al-Kharkhi and Bishr al-Hafi, were also affiliated with him. In Shia sources, the latter is said to have been transformed after an interaction with al-Kazim, thus embarking on his spiritual journey.

Selected quotes

 "Allah has two proofs over men: outward proof and inward one. As for the outward proof, it is the messengers, the prophets, and the Imams. As for the inward proof, it is reason."
 "Little work from a scholar is doubly accepted; much work from the men of low desire and ignorance is refused."
 "Try hard that your time may be four hours: one hour is for supplicating Allah, one hour for the affairs of the livelihood, one hour for associating with the brothers (friends) and the reliable ones who let you know your defects and who are inwardly loyal to you, and one hour for that you are alone with yourselves (and) for non-forbidden things. Through this hour you have power over the three hours."
 "Tell yourselves of neither poverty nor a long lifetime, for whoever tells himself of poverty becomes miserly. Whoever tells himself of a long lifetime becomes greedy."
 "The generous and polite is under the protection of Allah; He does not leave him until He makes him enter the Garden. Allah sends out none as a prophet except the generous."
 "Misfortune is one for the patient and two for the impatient."
 "Silence is among the doors to wisdom; it brings about love and is a proof of all good things."
 "Good neighbor is not refraining from harm, but good neighbor is showing patience toward harm."
 "O Hisham, the Commander of the faithful [Ali], peace be on him, has said: 'Allah is not served through a thing better than reason. Man's reason is not perfect unless it has various qualities: unbelief and evil from him are safe [nonexistent]. Reason and good from him are hoped. The surplus of his money is spent [on charity]. The surplus of his speech is prevented. His share of the world is only daily bread. ... Abasement along with Allah is more beloved to him than exaltedness along with other than Him. Humbleness is more beloved to him than high rank. He regards as much the little good from other than him and as little his own good. He sees all men better than him, and that he is the most wicked of them in his soul."
 "How base is the world for people, unless God give them joy; and how great is this life, if God is not angry with them."

See also

Abdullah al-Aftah
Ali al-Rida
Fatimah bint Musa
Hajar Khatoon Mosque
Imamate in Shia doctrine
Imamate in Twelver doctrine
Isma'il ibn Jafar
Ja'far al-Sadiq
List of extinct Shia sects
List of notable Hijazis
Muhammad ibn Ja'far al-Sadiq (al-Dibaj)

Footnotes

References

External links

 Account of Musa encountering a lion on the outskirts of Medina

 

746 births
799 deaths
8th-century Arabs
Assassinated Shia imams
Deaths by poisoning
Shia imams
Twelve Imams
People from Baghdad
8th-century imams
Husaynids
8th-century people from the Abbasid Caliphate